Zenopontonia rex, the emperor shrimp or imperial shrimp, is a species of shrimp in the family Palaemonidae. It is found in shallow water in the tropical Indo-Pacific region. It lives in association with a sea cucumber, a nudibranch or other large mollusc, often changing its colour to match that of its host.

Description
The antennae are modified into a series of plates that extend forwards from the head, and the rostrum has a crest-like extension. The cephalothorax bears a small spine on either side. The first two pairs of legs bear pincers with short sensory hairs. The basic colour of this shrimp is orange-yellow to orange-red, with purple antennal plates, claws and walking legs. However, during the day, white chromatophores in the skin expand and may cover much of the dorsal surface and tail fan; in other instances, the white colour appears as a median band, and the basic orange colour is revealed elsewhere. The colouring also varies depending on the shrimp's host; the classic colouring usually occurs when it is associated with a sea cucumber, but it sometimes matches the colour of its host, particularly when associated with an opisthobranch.

Distribution and habitat
Zenopontonia rex is native to the tropical Indo-Pacific region. Its range extends from the Red Sea, Réunion and Mayotte to Hawaii and French Polynesia, and from southern Japan to New Caledonia and northern Australia.

Ecology
Zenopontonia rex lives as a commensal on sea cucumbers such as Bohadschia, Opheodesoma, Stichopus, Synapta maculata or  Thelenota, or on nudibranchs and other large molluscs including Asteronotus, Ceratosoma, Chromodoris, Cypraea,  Dendrodoris, Hexabranchus, Hypselodoris and Pleurobranchus; occasionally it has been observed living in association with a starfish such as Echinaster or Gomophia. There is often a pair of shrimps, or even three, on a single host, and then they usually have identical colouring. They keep to the dorsal surface or flanks, moving to the far side of the host if danger threatens. The shrimp feeds on detritus on the seabed, as well as cleaning the surface of its host and feeding on mucus and faeces. This species is gonochoric; the male uses his first two pairs of walking legs to deposit sperm on the underside of the female's thorax, where the eggs are incubated until they hatch. The larvae are planktonic.

References

Animals described in 1922
Crustaceans of the Indian Ocean
Crustaceans of the Pacific Ocean
Palaemonidae